Church of Our Lady of the Rosary may refer to:

 Church of Our Lady of the Rosary (Alcamo), Italy
 Church of Our Lady of the Rosary (Doha), Qatar
 Church of Our Lady of the Rosary (Vitória), Brazil
 Church of Our Lady of the Rosary, Asmara, Eritrea
 Church of Our Lady of the Rosary (Goa), India